Basiothia laticornis is a moth of the family Sphingidae. It is only known from Madagascar.

It is similar to Basiothia medea, but immediately distinguishable by the generally brown forewing and hindwing uppersides. The antennae are strongly clubbed in both sexes, but noticeably longer and thicker in the male. The forewing upperside is purplish-brown. There are three antemedian lines present. There is a darker brown patch distal to the apex of the discal cell.

The female has a wingspan of 35–40 mm.

References

Basiothia
Moths described in 1879
Moths of Madagascar
Moths of Africa